The Blue Peter is a 1955 (copyright 1954) British film directed by Wolf Rilla and starring Kieron Moore and Greta Gynt. The film was retitled Navy Heroes and released in the United States in December 1957. The film is about youth seamanship at the original Outward Bound in Aberdyfi, Wales, a program  similar to Sea Scouting or Sea Cadets.

Premise
Shellshocked following his experiences as a POW, naval war hero Mike Merriworth (Kieron Moore) enrols as a physical instructor at an Outward Bound sea school in Wales, and discovers new purpose shaping the lives of the boys in his charge.

Cast

 Kieron Moore as Mike Merriworth
 Greta Gynt as Mary Griffin
 Sarah Lawson as Gwyneth Thomas
 Mervyn Johns as Captain Snow
 Mary Kerridge as Mrs Snow
 Harry Fowler as Charlie Barton
 John Charlesworth as Andrew Griffin
 Anthony Newley as Fred Starling
 Brian Roper as Tony Mullins
 Edwin Richfield as Number One
 Richard Bennett as Roger
 William Ingram as Karl

Production
It was one of several scripts Don Sharp wrote for Group Three. He had an idea for a film about the Outward Bound Program and researched it at a camp in Wales. Sharp also worked on the film as a second unit director.

Critical reception
TV Guide wrote, "Several humorous scenes of camping life and a lively group of youngsters brighten an otherwise routine programmer."

References

External links

The Blue Peter at BFI

1955 films
British adventure drama films
Films directed by Wolf Rilla
Films produced by Herbert Mason
Films scored by Antony Hopkins
1950s English-language films
1950s British films
1950s adventure drama films